Haraamkhor is a 2015 Indian romantic drama black comedy film directed by Shlok Sharma. It stars Nawazuddin Siddiqui and Shweta Tripathi. Jasleen Royal is the music composer. The film was shot in just 16 days.

In April 2017, an FIR was registered against director Shlok Sharma on a complaint by Balbharati, Maharashtra's textbook bureau, objecting to striking similarities between its logo and promotion scenes from Haraamkhor.

Haraamkhor was premiered at the 21st annual New York Indian Film Festival (NYIFF) and Indian Film Festival of Los Angeles (IFFLA). Nawazuddin Siddiqui received the Best Actor award at the NYIFF.

Plot
Shyam is a school teacher in a village. Sandhya, and her best friends Mintu and Kamal are some of his students. Kamal has a crush on Sandhya, but she is not interested. After school, Shyam visits Sandhya's home to have some documents notarized by her father, who is a local police inspector. Sandhya and Shyam become closer. Sandhya takes care of her father when he arrives home drunk and her was snoring She follows him to a party when he lies to her about going on a work trip. On her way home, Sandhya falls and injures her knee and goes to Shyam's house, where his wife, Sunita cares for her and lets her stay with them for the night. Sandhya spies on Shyam and Sunita having sex. While she is asleep, Shyam tries to talk to Sandhya and teases her, but she is angry with him.

The next day, Sandhya rebukes Shyam for lying to her about how he and his wife did not have sexual relations. It is revealed that Sandhya's mom abandoned her as a child and her father has started dating someone new, but was waiting for the right time to tell her. Shyam fixes an old moped (Luna) at Sandhya's home. They meet in secret and start having an affair. Kamal is jealous and Mintu wants to help him.

Sandhya and Shyam have sex. One month later, she reveals that she hasn't gotten her period, so they make a secret trip to the city. At the woman's clinic, Sandhya is recognized by her father's girlfriend, who keeps her secret. Sandhya is not pregnant and she and Shyam share a laugh about it. When they return to the village, Shyam tells Sandhya that they should stop seeing each other and keep their relationship strictly a student-teacher one.

Rumors reveal their secret anyway and Sunita threatens to leave Shyam. Shyam scolds and hits Sandhya for being obvious. Meanwhile, Mintu and Kamal wreak havoc in Shyam's empty home. Sunita comes back home. Shyam becomes suspicious of the kids breaking and entering his home when he sees them with some of his stuff.  Shyam catches hold of Mintu and kills him by asphyxiation. Kamal manages to escape. But as he sees Shyam trying to suffocate Mintu to death, he returns with a rock and hits it hard on Shyam, killing him in the process.

Cast
 Nawazuddin Siddiqui as Shyam Tekchand, School Master
 Shweta Tripathi as Sandhya, student
 Trimala Adhikari as Sunita, Shyam's wife
 Mohammad Samad as Mintu, Sandhya’s classmate
 Irfan Khan as Kamal, Sandhya’s classmate
 Harish Khanna as Raghuvir Singh, police inspector, Sandhya's father
 Shreya Shah as Neelu, Sandhya's father's girlfriend
 Hanif as Shaktimaan
 Jhanvi Trivedi as Archana
 Nandini Khatri as Bindiya
 Puja Banerjee as Gynaecologist

Soundtrack
The soundtrack of Haraamkhor consists of just one song, "Kidre Jaawan", which was composed by Jasleen Royal and the lyrics of which were written by Aditya Sharma.

Critical reception
Rajeev Masand of News18 praised the performances of the actors saying that, "the film benefits enormously from the convincing performances at its heart. Shweta Tripathi is in good form as the confused, ignored young teenager who can’t help making all the wrong choices. But it’s Nawazuddin Siddiqui whose brilliant, mostly understated portrayal of a violent predator is the film’s biggest strength." and gave the film a rating of 3 out of 5. Rohit Vats of Hindustan Times praised the film saying that, "Brave and original, Haraamkhor walks the razor’s edge. One tiny mistake, and it could have been pronounced morally twisted. However, Haraamkhor is one film you just shouldn’t miss, even if it’s just to see how Hindi cinema is exploring new themes with finesse." and gave the film a rating of 4.5 out of 5. Mayank Bharara of ShowBiz-BizAsia rated the film 7 out of 10 stars. Bharara praised the actors' performances as engaging but noted that the plot "has a tendency to get monotonous."

References

External links
 
 

2015 films
2015 romantic drama films
2010s Hindi-language films
Indian romantic drama films
Films scored by Jasleen Royal